7 is the ninth studio album by British soul and R&B singer-songwriter Seal. The album was released on 6 November 2015 by Warner Bros. Records. Its title comes from being Seal's seventh album of original songs, his first since Seal 6: Commitment (2010).

The singles "Every Time I'm with You" and "Do You Ever" were released on 11 September 2015. Two promotional singles were released in advance of the album: "Life on the Dancefloor" on 2 October and "Padded Cell" on 16 October. The bonus track "Whatever You Need" is a reworked version of a Togetherland track called "Breathe", making it only the second officially released song from that unreleased album, following "This Could Be Heaven" from the Family Man soundtrack.

Track listing
All tracks produced by Trevor Horn and Seal, except as noted.

Personnel
 Seal – vocals (all), programming (4, 7, 10)
 Joel Peters – drums (1, 4, 5, 7), programming (4, 5, 9), percussion (7, 10)
 Earl Harvin – drums (1, 2, 4), cymbals (4)
 Ash Soan – drums (4, 5, 7, 9)
 Abe Rounds – drums (8)
 Aaron Horn – programming (1, 4, 7)
 Stephan Moccio – piano (1), keyboards (1), programming (1)
 Julian Hinton – keyboards (1), programming (6, 9)
 Jamie Odell – keyboards (3, 8), programming (3, 4, 7, 8)
 Cameron Gower Poole – programming (4, 5, 9, 10), percussion (7)
 Dave McCracken – programming (4)
 Justin Parker – keyboards (5), programming (5)
 Anne Dudley – piano (5)
 Tim Weidner – programming (5), sound FX (6)
 Trevor Horn – bass guitar (2, 3, 5, 7–9), keyboards (all), guitar (1, 4, 5), backing vocals (9)
 Chris Bruce – bass guitar (1, 2, 4, 6–8, 11), guitar (1, 4, 5, 7)
 Jamie Muhoberac – bass guitar (9, 10), piano (1, 2, 4, 5, 7, 9, 11), Hammond organ (2, 4, 9), keyboards (1, 2, 4, 5, 7–11), programming (1, 3–5, 7, 9–11)
 Paul Turner – bass guitar (4)
 Simon Bloor – guitar (1–9), piano (4, 6, 10), keyboards (2, 7–10), programming (2, 3, 6, 10, 11)
 Phil Palmer – guitar (2, 4–6, 8, 9)
 Lol Creme – guitar (4, 7–9), percussion (9), backing vocals (9)
 Josh Campbell – guitar (7)
 Luís Jardim – percussion (1, 2, 5–7, 9, 10)
 Paul Spong – trumpet (3, 8)
 Steve Sidwell – trumpet (3, 8)
 Andy Wood – trombone (3, 8)
 Dave Bishop – saxophone (3, 8)
 Minnetonka – backing vocals (4)
 Mr Probz – backing vocals (4)
 orchestral arrangement/orchestra conducted by Anne Dudley (1, 2, 4, 6), Nick Ingman (5, 7, 10), Hinton (9)
 additional orchestration – Hinton (6), Bloor (9)
 brass arrangement – Steve Sidwell (3, 8)

Charts

Weekly charts

Year-end charts

Certifications

References

2015 albums
Albums produced by Trevor Horn
Seal (musician) albums
Warner Records albums